Andreas Jud was an Italian luger who competed in the 1980s and early 1990s. A natural track luger, he won four medals in the men's doubles event at the FIL World Luge Natural Track Championships with three golds (1982, 1984, 1990) and one silver (1986).

Jud earned four medals at the FIL European Luge Natural Track Championships with two golds (Doubles: 1983, 1987) and two bronzes (Singles: 1983, Doubles: 1985).

References
Natural track European Championships results 1970-2006.
Natural track World Championships results: 1979-2007

Italian lugers
Italian male lugers
Living people
Year of birth missing (living people)
Sportspeople from Südtirol